McNee Ranch  is located in the Santa Cruz Mountains of the United States, near the unincorporated community of Montara, California in San Mateo County. The highest point in the 690-acre ranch rises to 1,898 feet above sea level.  An unpaved fire road, the North Peak Access Road, accessible from the Pedro Mountain Road, provides access to the summit by hikers.  The mountain has an extensive biodiversity especially on the serpentine soils of the lower slopes where such endangered species as Hickman's potentilla and San Mateo thornmint, Acanthomintha duttonii, are found.  On rare occasions light snow has dusted the summit. On clear days the summit provides views of much of the San Francisco Bay Area.

The ranch is part of Montara State Beach.

References

External links
 General Information
 Hiking Information
 Photos of Hikes
 Official California State Parks web site for Montara Beach

State parks of California
San Francisco Bay Area beaches
Parks in San Mateo County, California
Santa Cruz Mountains
Landforms of San Mateo County, California